The Budapest Grand Prix (also Hungarian Grand Prix) is a women's tennis tournament held in Budapest, Hungary. This WTA Tour event is an International-level tournament and is played on outdoor clay courts.

The tournament was formerly known as Poli-Farbe Budapest Grand Prix, Gaz de France Grand Prix, GDF Suez Grand Prix, Tippmix Budapest Grand Prix, Colortex Budapest Grand Prix, Westel 900 Budapest Open, Budapest Lotto Open, Budapest Open, and Budapest Grand Prix.

The event was replaced in the 2014 WTA Tour with a new tournament Bucharest Open held in Bucharest, Romania. It returned in 2021 as the Hungarian Grand Prix.

Past finals

Singles

Doubles

See also
List of tennis tournaments
Hungarian Ladies Open
Hungarian Pro Circuit Ladies Open
Stella Artois Clay Court Championships
Budapest Challenger (September)
Budapest Challenger (May)

References

External links
Official Home Page
WTA Tour profile

 
Grand Prix
Tennis tournaments in Hungary
Clay court tennis tournaments
WTA Tour
Recurring sporting events established in 1996
1996 establishments in Hungary